OBJREF is the name of the structure of marshalled interfaces in COM and DCOM. Because COM interfaces can only be called directly from the context (like a thread, process or machine) where they originated, when they are needed in another context they are marshalled in this structure, which is then passed to the destination context where it is unmarshalled to a proxy that takes care of the necessary communication, for example passing messages or network packets or marshalling other interfaces passed in calls.

Format
The layout of the structure is as follows:

The layout of DUALSTRINGARRAY is:

The string bindings are null-terminated records specifying connection information, like IP addresses, and the security bindings are null-terminated records specifying authentication information. Both arrays are null-terminated too.

References

Component-based software engineering